Lebyazhye is a rural locality (a selo) in Barnaul, Altai Krai, Russia. The population was 5,484 as of 2013. There are 34 streets.

Geography 
Lebyazhye is located 17 km southwest of Barnaul by road. Yuzhny is the nearest rural locality.

References 

Rural localities in Barnaul urban okrug